Callianthe darwinii is a shrub typically growing 2 m tall, native to Brazil (South America). The flowers are pink.

Uses
Callianthe darwinii is a popular ornamental plant in hot regions with a humid climate.

References

Flora of Brazil
darwinii